Wild Tales may refer to:

 Wild Tales (album), a 1974 album by Graham Nash
 Wild Tales (film), a 2014 Argentine film
 Wild Tales, a 2014 autobiography by Graham Nash